Birdland may refer to:

Places and attractions
 Birdland Park and Gardens, a bird park at Bourton-on-the-Water, Gloucestershire, England
 Tropical Birdland, Leicestershire, a bird zoo
 Birdland, San Diego, a community
 Oriole Park at Camden Yards, nicknamed Birdland, an American baseball stadium
 Birdland (New York jazz club), a club in New York City
 Birdland (Hamburg jazz club), a jazz club in Hamburg
 Birdland, a jazz club in Vienna founded by Joe Zawinul
 Marie Byrd Land, a region of Antarctica

Created works
 Drawing Blood, originally titled Birdland, a novel by Poppy Z. Brite
 Birdland, an erotic comic book by Gilbert Hernandez, published by Eros Comix
 Birdland (TV series), an American series produced by Walter F. Parkes
 Gibson Byrdland, an electric guitar made by Gibson
Music

 Birdland (Birdland album), the debut album by Birdland
 Birdland (The Yardbirds album), a 2003 album by the Yardbirds
 Birdland, a posthumously released 2015 album by Buddy Rich
 "Birdland", single by Chubby Checker written by Mann, Smith 1963
 "Birdland", song by the Psychedelic Furs 
 "Birdland" (song), composed by Joe Zawinul, originally recorded by his band Weather Report, covered as a single by the Manhattan Transfer in 1980	
 "Birdland", a song by Patti Smith from Horses
 "Lullaby of Birdland", a 1952 popular song written by George Shearing and George David Weiss
 The Birdland Big Band, 16-piece jazz orchestra in residence at Birdland Jazz Club in New York City
 Birdland (band), a 1980s English indie band
 Birdland, an American band co-founded by Lester Bangs

See also
 Live at Birdland (disambiguation)